Agapanthus praecox (common agapanthus, blue lily, African lily,  or lily of the Nile) is a popular garden plant around the world, especially in Mediterranean climates. It is native to the Kwa-Zulu Natal and Western Cape provinces of South Africa. Local names include agapant, bloulelie, isicakathi and ubani.<ref name=plantzafrica>{{cite web|url=http://www.plantzafrica.com/plantab/agapanpraecox.htm|archive-url=https://web.archive.org/web/20040305054515/http://www.plantzafrica.com/plantab/agapanpraecox.htm|url-status=live|archive-date=2004-03-05|title=Agapanthus praecox Willd.|work=PlantZAfrica.com|publisher=South African National Biodiversity Institute|accessdate=2008-07-20}}</ref> Most of the cultivated plants of the genus Agapanthus are hybrids or cultivars of this species. It is divided into three subspecies: subsp.praecox, subsp. orientalis and subsp. minimus. 

DescriptionAgapanthus praecox is a variable species with open-faced flowers. It is a perennial plant that can survive up to 75 years. Its evergreen leaves are 2 cm wide and 50 cm long. Its inflorescence is in umbel. The flowers of the agapanthus are blue, purple or white and bloom from late spring to summer. They give capsules filled with fine black seeds (to be kept cool in sand until sowing). Its stem reaches one meter high. Its roots are very powerful and can break concrete.

SubspeciesAgapanthus praecox subsp. praecoxThis subspecies occurs in the Eastern Cape province of South Africa. It usually grows to between 0.8 and 1 metre tall and has 10-11 leathery leaves. The blue flowers, appear from December to February. These have perianth segments which are greater than 50 mm in length.Agapanthus praecox subsp. orientalisThis subspecies occurs in the Eastern Cape and southern KwaZulu-Natal. Although it is  about the same height as subsp. praecox, it has up to 20 poisonous, strap-like leaves per plant which are arching and are not leathery. These range in length from 20 to 70 cm long and 3 to 5 cm wide. Flower colour ranges from blue to white. Shiny black seeds are produced in three-sided capsules. These have perianth segments which are less than 50 mm in length.Agapanthus praecox subsp. minimusOccurring in the southeastern Western Cape and Eastern Cape, this subspecies is the smallest, ranging in height from 300 to 600 mm. It has a longer flowering season, from November to March. Flower colour includes white and various shades of blue.

Cultivation
The plant prefers a well-drained soil, but supports a poor soil. Exposure to full sun is preferable, but it supports partial shade. It does not like to be moved. It can be multiplied by sowing (flowering under 3 to 4 years) or division. It tolerates drought once well installed, but watering is preferable in case of long dry periods. It overwinters as a stump and therefore completely disappears during the cold months. Contrary to popular belief, this species can withstand wind, frost and cold up to −15 °C provided that the strains are protected for the first two years with mulching.

Young shoots need to be protected from slugs and snails. A contribution of 2 or 3 handfuls of wood ash around the stump in the spring will push the gastropods a few days and make a good contribution of potash.

Naturalisation
The species is naturalised in Australia, New Zealand and the Isles of Scilly. It is reportedly naturalized in Madeira, the Canary Islands, Eritrea, Ethiopia, St. Helena,  Norfolk Island, Mexico, Honduras, Costa Rica and Tristan da Cunha.Agapanthus praecox  subsp. orientalis is highly regarded for being tough in sun and heat, long-flowering, and is a favourite for many councils in Australia for the landscaping of roads and other public areas which do not get watered. The plant is still widely planted but in some areas it is considered a weed, and planting has been discontinued, although it is not generally regarded as highly invasive.

Gallery

See also
Agapanthus in New Zealand
 List of plants known as lily

References

External links

PlantZAfrica.com - Agapanthus praecox''

praecox
Flora of the Cape Provinces
Flora of KwaZulu-Natal
Garden plants
Saint Helena